Eigerøy Lighthouse is a coastal lighthouse located at the small island of Midbrødøya which is located immediately west of the island of Eigerøya in Eigersund municipality in Rogaland county, Norway. It was established in 1854 and automated in 1989.

This was Norway's first cast iron lighthouse, and its success encouraged the building of many more on the Norwegian coastline. The light emits three white flashes every 30 seconds. The light uses a 1st order Fresnel lens and produces a 3,905,000-candela light.

The tower is attached to a 2-story service building.  The lighthouse is painted red with one white horizontal band.  The lighthouse was automated in 1989 and it remains under the control of the Kystverket.  There are a limited number of tours available.  It is accessible by road and the tower is open for touring on Sundays in July.

See also

Lighthouses in Norway
List of lighthouses in Norway

References

External links

Norsk Fyrhistorisk Forening 

Lighthouses completed in 1854
Lighthouses in Rogaland
Listed lighthouses in Norway
1854 establishments in Norway